The 2015 World Junior Table Tennis Championships were held in Vendée, France, from 29 November to 6 December 2015. It was organised by the Fédération Française de Tennis de Table under the auspices and authority of the International Table Tennis Federation (ITTF).

Medal summary

Events

Medal table

See also
2015 World Table Tennis Championships

References

World Junior Table Tennis Championships
World Junior Table Tennis Championships
World Junior Table Tennis Championships
World Junior Table Tennis Championships
Table tennis competitions in France
International sports competitions hosted by France
World Junior Table Tennis Championships
World Junior Table Tennis Championships